The International Music Festival Heidelberger Frühling is an annual classical music festival held in Heidelberg in March and April since 1997, with over 100 events and 47,000 visitors (2018). In addition to the festival's productions and concert operations with internationally established performers, ensembles and orchestras, the "Heidelberger Frühling", organised as a non-profit limited liability company, conceives and organises other projects such as the Heidelberg String Quartet Festival, the Heidelberg Festival Academy for Lied Singing, Chamber Music, Composition and Music Journalism, and the Heidelberg Music Conference, an annual meeting of major European festivals and concert halls. The managing director is Thorsten Schmidt. The Heidelberg Spring belongs to the festival region Rhein-Neckar.

History 
The first "Heidelberger Frühling" took place in 1997. After the first two years with the Philharmonic Orchestra, the music festival became independent. In March 2006, the Heidelberger Frühling gGmbH was founded. In 2010 the Heidelberger Frühling Stiftung was established and in 2011 the Freundeskreis des Heidelberger Frühling celebrated its 10th anniversary. In 2016, the festival celebrated its 20th birthday.

String Quartet Festival 
Since 2005, the Heidelberg String Quartet Festival has created an atmosphere of concentrated deceleration, of interaction between artists and visitors, of immersion in the study of the string quartet genre. From morning until late at night, outstanding ensembles create the demanding programme of workshops, lectures and concerts. Initially, the String Quartet Festival took place as part of the Heidelberg Spring Music Festival, but since 2012 it has been a small festival in its own right, always taking place for four days at the end of January. Four to five ensembles are invited each year, with established quartets meeting young newcomers. The workshops are currently held by radio presenter, director and scriptwriter  and violinist Oliver Wille (Kuss Quartet) and deal in depth with questions of design and interpretation. The venue for the String Quartet Festival is the Alte , designated for this purpose as the Festival Forum, which in addition to a concert hall and rehearsal rooms also offers a festival cafeteria that serves as a meeting place for all artists and guests between and after the events.

Festival Academy 
Founded in 2011, the Festival Academy is the creative centre of the Heidelberger Frühling. Here young outstanding musicians from all over the world come together to make music, exchange ideas, find and pass on inspiration, reflect and make new contacts. The Festival Academy sees itself as a place of connection, opening and deepening. It deals with music in its socio-political dimension, makes processes of creation visible and encourages discourse about its meaning and perspectives. Open Classes and Open Stages, workshop concerts and discussion rounds – in these and other formats, the audience can get to know the young artists at work and look over the mentors' shoulders.

The Festival Academy of the Heidelberg Frühling comprises four areas: Lied (artistic director: Thomas Hampson), Chamber Music (artistic director: Igor Levit), Composition (successor to the Heidelberg Studio, artistic director: Matthias Pintscher) and Music Journalism (since 2015, director: Eleonore Büning). Mentors of current and past academy years are Barbara Bonney, Ian Bostridge, Brigitte Fassbaender, Graham Johnson, Thomas Quasthoff, Wolfram Rieger, Veronika Eberle, Ning Feng, Matan Porat, Thorleif Thedéen, Frederic Rzewski, Manuel Brug and Sophie Diesselhorst. In addition, there are numerous expert speakers from humanities disciplines.

Lied focus 
Heidelberg is considered a city of Lieder – not least because of Clemens Brentano and Achim von Arnim's Lied collection Des Knaben Wunderhorn. For this reason, the Heidelberger Frühling has made it its task to make the genre of art song, which many consider to be hermetic, accessible to a wider audience again. The founding of the Heidelberg International Song Centre in February 2016 bundles these activities. One of the first projects of the Song Centre is one of the most renowned competitions for song – Thomas Quasthoff's International Song Competition Das Lied, which has been held every two years since 2009 and took place in Heidelberg for the first time in 2017.

The festival has a prominent comrade-in-arms in the American baritone Thomas Hampson, who has been closely associated with Heidelberg and the Heidelberger Frühling since the "Wunderhorn Week" in 2006. Under his direction, interpretation courses and symposia with young voice students have taken place several times in the past, and since 2011, Hampson has been the artistic director of the Lied Academy of the Heidelberger Frühling. In addition to the Lied Academy, the programme has always included numerous classical Lieder recitals. In the past, almost all the great Lied interpreters have performed in the Neckarstadt, including Annette Dasch, Jonas Kaufmann, Christine Schäfer, Christian Gerhaher, Christoph Prégardien, Thomas Hampson and many others. In addition to established greats, up-and-coming new discoveries are also given a podium in Heidelberg, such as the soprano Hanna-Elisabeth Müller and the baritone Andrè Schuen.

A special concern of the festival is to work out approaches to what the tradition of song in its manifold forms still has to say to us today and in the future. This is reflected in the "Lied.Lab" format introduced in 2015, in which young singers are given conceptual freedom to develop their personal vision of what the song recital of the future should look like for them. An experiment with new forms, unusual venues, surprising combinations and pushing boundaries.

Music education by young people for young people 
Under the name "Classic Scouts", young people between the ages of 14 and 18 have been familiarising their peers with "Spring" since 2008 and trying to get them excited about classical music. They give concert introductions and accompany young classical music newcomers on their first concert visit. They experience artists at rehearsal visits, artist meetings and workshops, some of them also in schools, and create their own evening within the framework of the festival, from conception to execution. The project has been supported by the SAS Institute from the beginning. In addition, the trumpeter Reinhold Friedrich donated the prize money from the Palatinate Prize awarded to him in 2014 to the youth project. In October 2015, the Heidelberger Frühling was awarded the ECHO Klassik in the category "Promotion of Young Musicians" for the "Classic Scouts" project.

Heidelberg Music Conference 
Since 2013, the Heidelberger Frühling has organised a two-day conference for the classical concert and festival industry during the festival period. The Heidelberg Music Conference is dedicated to a different theme each year.

 2013: "Festivals 3.0 – eine Möglichkeit Zukunft zu gestalten?", die Eröffnungskeynote hielt Gerard Mortier
 2014: "Neues schaffen statt Copy & Paste", u. a. mit Architekt und ausgebildetem Musiker Daniel Libeskind
 2015: "Die Kunst ist frei – aber wie lange noch?"
 2018: "Der Kult des Besonderen – Wie eine Gesellschaft im Wandel das Verhältnis von Musikbetrieb und Publikum revolutioniert"

Heidelberger Frühling Music Award 

The Heidelberger Frühling Music Award has been in existence since 2013. The award is endowed with 10,000 euros and is given annually in rotation to cultural workers or cultural journalists who make a substantial and sustained contribution to the communication of classical music.

Venues 
Since its foundation, the Heidelberger Frühling has played almost 50 venues in Heidelberg and in the Rhine-Neckar Metropolitan Region. The venues can be recognised during the festival by the green flags. In the past, the atrium of the research and development centre of Heidelberger Druckmaschinen AG, the Operon Auditorium European Molecular Biology Laboratory, the Villa Bosch studio, the Stadtgarten restaurant, the BASF SE social hall, Ludwigshafen, the bakery of the Mantei bakery.

Financing 
The city of Heidelberg is a shareholder of Heidelberger Frühling gGmbH and, together with the state of Baden-Württemberg, provides approximately 22.6% of the budget of around 4.52 million euros through an annual subsidy (as of October 2018).) The Heidelberger Frühling generates 77.4% of its budget from its own income (v. a. The Heidelberger Frühling generates 77% of its budget from its own income (mainly from ticket sales, media rights and advertisements in printed matter), fundraising and sponsoring.

An essential element of fundraising is the Freundeskreis des Heidelberger Frühlings e. V., which has existed since 2001 and in which more than 1000 companies and private individuals have joined to support the festival from the side of Heidelberg's business community and citizens.

The main sponsors of the Heidelberger Frühling are HeidelbergCement as a founding partner, the MLP AG, Octapharma and SAP SE.

References

External links 

 
 Heidelberger Streichquartettfest

Classical music festivals in Germany
Heidelberg
Echo (music award) winners